The Chilean Field Hockey Federation, is the governing body of field hockey in Chile. It is based in Santiago, was founded in 1981 by Rodolfo Westendarp, however, since 1962 field hockey in Chile was practiced at events in the city of Viña del Mar by British immigrants. The president is Andrés De Witt Hepp. It also runs the Chile national teams for men and women.

Directory
President: Andrés De Witt Hepp
General Secretary: Larry Sargent

References

External links
Federación Chilena Hockey Sobre Césped
https://web.archive.org/web/20111023005626/http://2011.chilehockey.cl/institucion/directorio/

Sports governing bodies in Chile
Field hockey in Chile
National members of the Pan American Hockey Federation